Eva by Heart is the first solo studio album (third overall) by American singer Eva Cassidy. It was released in 1997, a year after Cassidy's death.

Track listing
"I Know You by Heart" (Eve Nelson, Diane Scanlon) – 3:57
"Time Is a Healer" (Diane Scanlon, Greg Smith) – 4:14
"Wayfaring Stranger" (Traditional) – 4:26
"Wade in the Water" (Traditional) – 4:00
"Blues in the Night" (Harold Arlen, Johnny Mercer) – 4:05
"Songbird" (Christine McVie) – 3:41
"Need Your Love So Bad" (Little Willie John, Mertis John Jr.) – 4:36 (duet with Chuck Brown)
"Say Goodbye" (Steven Digman, Andrew Hernandez) – 3:55
"Nightbird" (Doug MacLeod) – 5:27
"Waly, Waly" (Traditional) – 4:45
"How Can I Keep from Singing?" (Traditional) – 4:24
"Dark End of the Street" (Dan Penn, Chips Moman) - 3.54

Personnel

Musicians
Eva Cassidy – acoustic guitar, guitar, strings, cello, keyboards, vocals, background vocals, wah wah guitar
Chris Biondo – acoustic guitar, bass
Keith Grimes – electric guitar
Raice McLeod – drums
Chuck Brown – background vocals
Mark Carson – piano, background vocals
Dan Cassidy – violin
Doug Elliot – trombone
Anthony Flowers – organ
John Gillespie – organ, background vocals
Dan Haverstock – trombone
William "JuJu" House – drums
Larry Melton – bass
Leigh Pilzer – baritone saxophone, tenor saxophone
Mike Stein – violin
Karen Van Sant – violin
Chris Walker – trumpet
Lenny Williams – organ, strings, keyboards
Kent Wood – piano

Production
Producer: Chris Biondo
Engineers: Chris Biondo, Lenny Williams, Kent Wood
Remastering: Robert Vosgien
Arranger: Eva Cassidy
Horn arrangements: Leigh Pilzer
String arrangements: Lenny Williams
Drum programming: Chris Biondo
Liner notes: Joel Siegel
Design: Eileen White

Charts

References

Eva Cassidy albums
1997 debut albums
Albums published posthumously